The Carruther's mountain squirrel (Funisciurus carruthersi)  is a species of rodent in the family Sciuridae. It is found in Burundi, Democratic Republic of the Congo, Rwanda, and Uganda. Its natural habitat is subtropical or tropical moist montane forests.

References

Funisciurus
Rodents of Africa
Mammals described in 1906
Taxa named by Oldfield Thomas
Taxonomy articles created by Polbot